Katherine Jane "Katy" Harris (previously Nelson) is a fictional character from the British ITV soap opera Coronation Street, portrayed by Lucy-Jo Hudson. She made her first on-screen appearance on 13 November 2002, before departing in 2005. The teenage daughter of the Harris family, Katy's storylines centred on her family's victimisation by a gang, her diabetic diagnosis and her relationship with Martin Platt (Sean Wilson).

Her departing storyline entitled "Killer Katy", in which she had an abortion, murdered her father, and then killed herself has been described as one of the soaps most sensational and shocking storylines.

Storylines 
In November 2002, Katy moved into No. 6, Coronation Street with her father Tommy (Thomas Craig), mother Angela (Kathryn Hunt) and younger brother Craig (Richard Fleeshman).

The Nelson family had moved to Manchester from Sheffield after secretly being placed under a witness protection programme, as Angela was due to testify in a gangland murder trial. Tommy, a mechanic, started working for Kevin Webster (Michael Le Vell), Angela worked at Underworld while Katy attended school and had a rivalry with Candice Stowe (Nikki Sanderson). She also had a relationship with Tyrone Dobbs (Alan Halsall). (The two actors got married in real life in 2009.)

Katy snuck away to see her friends in Sheffield but was followed back to Coronation Street by the brother of the defendant her mother was due to testify against. The two brothers then came to Weatherfield in order to kill the family. Sally Webster (Sally Dynevor) told them where the family lived thinking they were friends, and they broke into the house and kept Katy hostage in the family home. When the Street find out about the hostage situation, the police were called. When Tommy hears Katy scream, he ran inside and was shot and hospitalised. Katy survived too and her captors were arrested but the family's true identity became common knowledge, so the family resumed using the surname Harris.

Katy discovered that she is diabetic, and nurse and neighbour Martin Platt (Sean Wilson) helped her to get used to giving herself daily injections of insulin. The pair developed a romantic relationship, even though Martin was nearly 20 years older than Katy, almost as old as her father. When her parents found out about the relationship they were unsupportive. Tommy hated Martin for sleeping with his daughter, branding him a 'pervert'. The Street also rejected their relationship. After Martin is injured in a car crash after being pursued by Tommy,  Angela tried to reconcile with her daughter. Katy befriended Martins children Sarah (Tina O'Brien) and David Platt (Jack P. Shepherd). In May 2004, they split up after Katy revealed she knew that Todd Grimshaw (Bruno Langley) was cheating on Sarah with her friend Karl Foster (Chris Finch). When Sarah miscarries her son Billy, Martin and Katy decided to get back together. She befriended Violet Wilson (Jenny Platt) in late 2004.

In August 2004, Katy and Martin planned to have a baby together. Katy became pregnant in early 2005, but her father started a rumour that Martin was back with his ex-wife Gail Platt (Helen Worth) and being unfaithful to Katy. Angela overhears Gail talking to Sally Webster about her affair with Ian Davenport (Philip Bretherton) and assumes that she is talking about Martin. She told Tommy what she heard and he felt vindicated. They also saw Martin and Sally talking and spending time together at Martin and Katy's flat. Other coincidences make Angela and Tommy certain that Martin and Sally are having an affair.

The two of them tell Katy what they've heard and she is heartbroken. She breaks up with Martin and is convinced by her parents to have an abortion. On hearing the affair rumour herself, Gail went to Angela and Tommy and told them that Martin and Sally were only good friends and that Sally is having an affair with someone else. Angela became regretful but Tommy was arrogant and the two of them had a massive argument. Katy came downstairs and Angela told her the truth. Katy was mortified to find out Martin really was faithful and she'd had the abortion for nothing. She left the house to confront him at the garage while he was working late at night. Katy was emotional and blamed her father for killing her baby. Tommy was unapologetic, ridiculing Katy and taunting her about her abortion and implying Martin was a paedophile. In the spur of the moment, she lashed out and hit him over the head with a wrench, killing him. Angela walked in just as Tommy fell to the floor. She persuaded Katy not to call the police and they staged a break-in. When Tommy's body was found the next morning by Kevin Webster, Angela and Katy went through the pretence that Tommy had been killed by an unknown intruder. In the murder investigation Martin Platt was number one suspect. Having to lie to Martin and her brother Craig made Katy feel guilty. Katy's grandfather Keith Appleyard (Ian Redford) moved into the family home to help look after his grandchildren.

Angela planned to dispose of the murder weapon but could not get the opportunity, and tried to persuade the police that the gang had killed Tommy and for the family to be given new identities. Katy struggled to deal with the situation, but Angela tried to help her cope. When the family visited the funeral parlour to view Tommy's body, Angela hid the wrench inside the coffin. Katy was left alone when forensic evidence led to Angela's arrest. Katy and Craig returned to Sheffield with their grandfather. After a few weeks, Katy returned to No. 6. and decided she couldn't live with the guilt any longer and wrote a note confessing the truth about her father's death before committing suicide by drinking water mixed with sugar (a deadly solution, because of her diabetes). The Platt family hear the TV next door of the supposedly vacant house. Martin broke down the door and found her lying unconscious on the sofa with the note beside her. She was taken to hospital, but died two weeks later. Angela was cleared of murder but received new charges for perverting the course of justice and had her prison sentence extended.

Development 
On her exiting storyline, Hudson said of Katy; "she's turned into a right psycho, which is much more interesting than playing a sweet schoolgirl. We filmed all these shots of Katy whacking Tommy with a wrench - it was ace. I didn't want Katy just going off to college, so I asked them if I could go out with a bang - and I am. Katy has an abortion, splits up with Martin, then kills her dad. Wow! And Killer Katy has quite a nice ring to it."

Reception 
The murder–suicide storyline was described as controversial.

References 

Coronation Street characters
Television characters introduced in 2002
Female characters in television
Teenage characters in television
Works about diabetes
Teenage pregnancy in television
Murder–suicide in television
Fictional murderers
Fictional criminals in soap operas
Female villains
Patricide in fiction
Fictional suicides
Abortion in fiction